This is a list of player transfers involving Major League Rugby teams that occurred from the end of the 2021 season and through the 2022 season.

Austin Gilgronis

Players In
 Brandon Asbel drafted
 Asa Carter drafted
 Caleb Strum drafted
 Marcel Brache from  Western Force
 Ryan Louwrens from  Hanazono Kintetsu Liners
 Julián Domínguez from  New Orleans Gold
 Luke Beauchamp from  Houston SaberCats
 Mark O'Keeffe from  Rugby ATL
 Casey McDermott Vai from  American Raptors

Players Out
 Ned Hodson to  Dallas Jackals
 Marcelo Torrealba released
 Dom Bailey to  Old Glory DC
 Moe Abdelmonem to  Dallas Jackals
 Reegan O'Gorman to  New England Free Jacks
 Frank Halai released
 Jeff Hassler released
 Nick Johnson released
 Paddy Ryan released
 Roderick Waters released

Dallas Jackals

Players In
 DeCor Davis drafted
 Calvin Gentry drafted
 Aaron Gray drafted
 Eric Naposki drafted
 Alejandro Torres drafted
 Mike Matarazzo from  Rugby ATL
 Bronson Teles from  Houston SaberCats
 Chris Pennell from  Worcester Warriors
 Charlie McKill from  Warringah
 Jérémy Lenaerts from  Houston SaberCats
 Henry Trinder from  Ampthill
 Carlo de Nysschen from  San Diego Legion
 Ned Hodson from  Austin Gilgronis
 Nate Lyon from  Austin Blacks
 Timothy Ohlwein from  Arkansas State
 Tayé Olagunju from  Georgia
 Alex Tucci from  Utah Warriors
 Liam Murray from  Houston SaberCats
 Christian Adams unattached
 Ayemere Oiyemhonlan from  St. Louis Bombers
 Ryan Bower from  London Irish
 Rory O'Connor from  Warringah
 Dewald Kotze from  Pacific Pride
 Dylan James from  LA Giltinis
 Todd Gleave from  Gloucester
 Adriaan Carelse from  Rugby ATL
 Tom Brusati from  New England Free Jacks
 Campbell Johnstone from  American Raptors
 Sam Phillips from  American Raptors
 Chad London unattached
 Conrado Roura from  Peñarol
 Moe Abdelmonem from  Austin Gilgronis
 Shawn Clark from  American Raptors
 Tommy Madaras from  American Raptors
 Adriaan Booysen from  Houston SaberCats

Players Out

Houston SaberCats

Players In
 Emmanuel Albert drafted
 Tinashe Muchena drafted
 Dillon Shotwell drafted
 Danny Barrett from  United States Sevens
 Matai Leuta from  United States Sevens
 Willie Britz from  Shining Arcs Tokyo-Bay Urayasu
 Keni Nasoqeqe from  San Diego Legion
 Dillon Smit from  Lions
 Jaco Bezuidenhout from  Blue Bulls
 Christian Dyer from  United States Sevens
 David Coetzer from  Bulls
 Kian Meadon from  Sharks U21
 Maka Unufe from  United States Sevens
 Louritz van der Schyff from  Blue Bulls
 Gerrie Labuschagné from  Pumas
 Siaosi Mahoni from  San Diego Legion
 Marcell Muller from  Free State Cheetahs
 Juan Pablo Zeiss from  Jaguares XV
 Wynand Grassmann from  Slava Moscow
 Marcos Moroni from  CUBA

Players Out
 Nika Khatiashvili to  The Black Lion
 Diego Magno released
 Bronson Teles to  Dallas Jackals
 Jérémy Lenaerts to  Dallas Jackals
 Liam Murray to  Dallas Jackals
 Tiaan Erasmus to  Rugby ATL
 Luke Beauchamp to  Austin Gilgronis
 Sam Windsor to  Rugby New York
 Paula Balekana to  New England Free Jacks
 Jinho Mun released
 De Wet Roos released
 Jeffrey Steele released
 Matías Freyre to  San Diego Legion
 Adriaan Booysen to  Dallas Jackals

LA Giltinis

Players In
 Sam Klimkowski drafted
 Gerald Lowe drafted
 James O'Neill drafted
 Will Chambers from  Cronulla Sharks
 Ben LeSage from  Toronto Arrows
 Djustice Sears-Duru from  Seattle Seawolves
 Brooklyn Hardaker from  Randwick
 Tas Smith from  Sydney University
 Leslie Leuluaʻialiʻi-Makin from  Kurita Water Gush Akishima
 D'Montae Noble from  Old Glory DC
 Andrew Tuala from  NSW Waratahs
 Jordan Trainor from  Auckland
 Hanco Germishuys from  Rugby New York
 Joe Taufeteʻe from  Lyon

Players Out
 Adam Ashley-Cooper retired
 Serupepeli Vularika to  Fijian Drua
 JP Smith to  Lions
 Ruan Smith to  NSW Waratahs
 Glenn Bryce retired
 Dylan James to  Dallas Jackals
 James O'Neill to  Toronto Arrows
 Blake Rogers released
 Seán O'Brien returned to  Leinster
 Pago Haini to  Rugby New York

New England Free Jacks

Players In
 Anthony Adamcheck drafted
 Zach Bastres drafted
 Cael Hodgson drafted
 Jesse Parete from  Yokohama Canon Eagles
 Wayne van der Bank from  Pumas
 Foster DeWitt from  Pacific Pride
 Jack Reeves from  Gloucester (two-season loan)
 Holden Yungert from  New Orleans Gold
 Le Roux Malan from  Ikey Tigers
 Mikaele Lomano from  Sacramento Young Tigers
 Stan van den Hoven from  Bay of Plenty
 Slade McDowall from  Otago
 Terrell Peita from  Auckland
 Alex Johnston from  Te Puke
 Tevita Sole from  Bay of Plenty
 Javon Camp-Villalovos from  Rhinos Rugby Academy
 Herman Agenbag from  Falcons
 Mills Sanerivi from  Taranaki
 Reegan O'Gorman from  Austin Gilgronis
 Paula Balekana from  Houston SaberCats

Players Out
 Wian Conradie to  Gloucester
 Ronan McCusker to  Doncaster Knights
 Kensuke Hatakeyama to  Toyota Industries Shuttles Aichi
 Stephan Coetzee released
 Tuidraki Samusamuvodre to  Fijian Drua
 Tom Brusati to  Dallas Jackals
 Jackson Thiebes retired
 Sef Fa'agase released
 Vili Tolutaʻu released
 Josateki Degei released
 Conor Kindregan released
 Aleki Morris-Lome returned to  Otago
 Tera Mtembu released
 Poasa Waqanibau released
 Matt Wirken released
 Nick Hryekewicz to  Old Glory DC

New Orleans Gold

Players In
 Christian Alvarez drafted
 Carmen Consolino drafted
 George Sharpe drafted
 Taylor Krumrei from  Seattle Seawolves
 Chase Schor-Haskin from  Rugby New York
 Devereaux Ferris from  Seattle Seawolves
 Aaron Matthews from  Seattle Seawolves
 Harley Wheeler from  United States Sevens
 Maciu Koroi from  Rugby ATL
 Paddy Ryan from  Austin Gilgronis

Players Out
 Nikola Bursic released
 Kevin O'Connor retired
 Kyle Baillie to  Toronto Arrows
 Holden Yungert to  New England Free Jacks
 Julián Domínguez to  Austin Gilgronis
 Hanno Dirksen to  Swansea
 Timothée Guillimin to  Nîmes
 Giovanni Lapp released
 John Sullivan to  Rugby ATL

Old Glory DC

Players In
 Labi Koi-Larbi drafted
 Palema Roberts drafted
 Junior Sa'u from  Leigh Centurions
 Rohan Saifoloi from  Eastern Suburbs
 Jake Ilnicki from  Seattle Seawolves
 Rob Irimescu from  Rugby New York
 William Talataina from  Ponsonby
 Dom Bailey from  Austin Gilgronis
 Fintan Coleman from  Young Munster
 Felix Kalapu from  Auckland
 Peni Lasaqa from  Bay of Plenty
 Kyle Stewart from  Taranaki
 Thomas Capriotti from  Penn State
 Michah Griffin from  Washington Irish
 Nick Hryekewicz from  New England Free Jacks
 John LeFevre from  Northern Virginia
 Jack Russell from  Northern Virginia

Players Out
 Jason Robertson to  Narbonne
 Ciaran Hearn retired
 Mungo Mason to  Oxford University
 Jamie Dever to  London Irish
 Mike Sosene-Feagai to  Toulon
 Steven Longwell to  Jersey Reds
 D'Montae Noble to  LA Giltinis
 Sam Cusano released
 Sean Hartig released
 James King released
 Max Lum released
 Casey Renaud released
 Dylan Taikato-Simpson released

Rugby ATL

Players In
 Sean Akins drafted
 Isaac Bales drafted
 Coleson Warner drafted
 Evan Mintern from  Rugby New York
 Will Leonard from  Rugby New York
 Tiaan Erasmus from  Houston SaberCats
 Joaquín de la Vega Mendía from  Hindú
 Justin Basson from  Stormers
 John-Roy Jenkinson from  Griquas
 John Sullivan from  New Orleans Gold
 George Barton from  Seattle Seawolves
 Nolan Tuamoheloa from  Pathway 404

Players Out
 Bautista Ezcurra to  Grenoble
 Mike Matarazzo to  Dallas Jackals
 Robbie Petzer to  Pumas
 Rory van Vugt returned to  Southland
 Manasa Saulo to  Fijian Drua
 Adriaan Carelse to  Dallas Jackals
 Mark O'Keeffe to  Austin Gilgronis
 Chance Wenglewski to  Rugby New York
 Maciu Koroi to  New Orleans Gold
 Neethling Gericke retired
 Jeremy Misailegalu released

Rugby New York

Players In
 Peter Reyes drafted
 Chase Schor-Haskin drafted
 Andrew Coe from  Canada Sevens
 Sam Windsor from  Houston SaberCats
 Chance Wenglewski from  Rugby ATL
 Jason Emery from  Manawatu
 Jack Heighton from  North Harbour
 Kalolo Tuiloma from  Counties Manukau
 Nic Mayhew from  North Harbour
 Ed Fidow from  Manawatu
 Brendon O'Connor from  Hawke's Bay
 Will Tucker from  Otago
 Pago Haini from  LA Giltinis
 Max Dacey from  American Raptors
 Jonathan Grzeszczyk from  White Plains
 John Powers from  Utah Warriors
 Ishmail Shabazz from  Te Awamutu

Players Out
 Ben Foden retired
 Samu Tawake to  Fijian Drua
 Dan Hollinshead to  Vannes
 Evan Mintern to  Rugby ATL
 Chase Schor-Haskin to  New Orleans Gold
 Will Leonard to  Rugby ATL
 Rob Irimescu to  Old Glory DC
 Harry Bennett retired
 Hanco Germishuys to  LA Giltinis

San Diego Legion

Players In
 Ma'a Nonu from  Toulon
 Thomas Capriotti drafted
 Jonah Dietenberger drafted
 Dominick Iacovino drafted
 Will Hooley from  Saracens
 Ben Grant from  Queensland Reds
 Hencus van Wyk from  Free State Cheetahs
 Rohan O'Regan from  Sydney University
 Matías Freyre from  Houston SaberCats
 Pat Lynott from  Toronto Arrows
 Joe Walsh from  Southland
 Matt Moulds from  Gloucester
 Tomas Aoake from  North Harbour
 Jale Vakaloloma unattached
 Jason Higgins from  Toronto Arrows
 Kainoa Lloyd from  Canada Sevens

Players Out
 Save Totovosau to  Narbonne
 Psalm Wooching to  Rouen
 Cronan Gleeson to  Tomitanii Constanța
 Jasa Veremalua to  Tel Aviv Heat
 Carlo de Nysschen to  Dallas Jackals
 Keni Nasoqeqe to  Houston SaberCats
 Cam Clark to  Brumbies
 Dylan Audsley released
 Joshua Furno released
 Siaosi Mahoni to  Houston SaberCats
 Ethan McVeigh to  Cardiff Metropolitan University
 Paddy Ryan returned to  Munakata Sanix Blues
 Thomas Capriotti to  Old Glory DC
 Aaron Mitchell to  Houston SaberCats
 Dean Muir to  Houston SaberCats
 Fakaʻosi Pifeleti to  Austin Gilgronis
 Cole Zarcone to  Seattle Seawolves

Seattle Seawolves

Players In
 Tavite Lopeti drafted
 Ethan Scott drafted
 Darell Williams drafted
 Dan Kriel from  Lions
 Juan Mostert from  Western Province U21
 Sam Matenga from  Tasman
 Mzamo Majola from  Sharks
 Duncan Matthews from  Golden Lions
 Martin Iosefo from  United States Sevens
 Reid Watkins from  Toronto Arrows
 Mike Brown from  Houston SaberCats
 Dewald Donald from  Blue Bulls
 Alex Glover from  Saint Mary's Gaels
 Tani Tupou from  American Raptors
 Augusto Böhme from  Selknam

Players Out
 Shalom Suniula retired
 George Barton released
 Andrew Durutalo to  Cambridge University
 Eric Duechle released
 Ross Neal to  Saracens (short-term deal)
 Taylor Krumrei to  New Orleans Gold
 Devereaux Ferris to  New Orleans Gold
 Aaron Matthews to  New Orleans Gold
 Djustice Sears-Duru to  LA Giltinis
 Jake Ilnicki to  Old Glory DC
 FP Pelser to  Golden Lions
 Nick Taylor released
 Seta Tuilevuka released
 Akihito Yamada returned to  Shining Arcs Tokyo-Bay Urayasu

Toronto Arrows

Players In
 Sam Mace drafted
 Logan Martin-Feek drafted
 Bryce Worden drafted
 Kyle Baillie from  New Orleans Gold
 James O'Neill from  LA Giltinis
 Ueta Tufuga from  Wairarapa Bush
 Isaac Salmon from  Tasman
 Andrew Norton from  Aparejadores
 Dennon Robinson-Bartlett from  Hawke's Bay
 Matthew Hood from  Australia Sevens
 Mitch Voralek from  Waterloo County
 Brandan Ferguson from  Peterborough Pagans
 Conor McCann from  Balmy Beach
 Cole Brown from  Ajax Wanderers
 Lolani Faleiva from  Hawke's Bay
 Taitusi Vikilani from  Burnaby Lake
 Brock Webster from  Pacific Pride

Players Out
 Leandro Leivas retired
 Jamie Mackenzie retired
 Ben LeSage to  LA Giltinis
 Gaston Cortes released
 Tayler Adams released
 Manuel Diana released
 Kolby Francis retired
 Manuel Montero released
 Pat Parfrey released
 Joaquín Tuculet to  Los Tilos
 Pat Lynott to  San Diego Legion
 Reid Watkins to  Seattle Seawolves
 Jason Higgins to  San Diego Legion

Utah Warriors

Players In
 Joey Backe drafted
 Connor Burns drafted
 Emerson Prior drafted
 Jamie Lane from  Auckland
 Caleb Makene from  Highlanders
 Niall Saunders unattached
 Jone Vatuwaliwali from  Ratu Kadavulevu School
 Taris Schramm from  Utah Warriors Selects
 Carson Shoemaker from  Utah Warriors Selects
 Tomasi Tonga from  Utah Warriors Selects
 Paul Lasike from  Harlequins

Players Out
 Matthew Dalton to  Newcastle Falcons
 Aston Fortuin to  Narbonne
 Matt Jensen retired
 Fraser Hurst released
 Hank Stevenson released
 Alex Tucci to  Dallas Jackals
 Tonati Lauti released
 Sama Malolo released
 Hagen Schulte retired
 Josh Whippy released
 Michael Baska to  Rouen

See also
List of 2021–22 Premiership Rugby transfers
List of 2021–22 RFU Championship transfers
List of 2021–22 Super Rugby transfers
List of 2021–22 United Rugby Championship transfers
List of 2021–22 Top 14 transfers
List of 2021–22 Rugby Pro D2 transfers

References

Major League Rugby